The following is a list of events affecting American television in 2012. Events listed include television show debuts, finales, and cancellations; channel launches, closures, and rebrandings; stations changing or adding their network affiliations; and information about controversies and carriage disputes.

Events

January

February

March

April

May

June

July
{|class="wikitable"
|-
! Date
! Event
|-
! rowspan="4"|2
|HDNet rebrands as AXS TV, beginning a refocus towards lifestyle and live event programming. The change is a result of the purchase of a share in the channel by a joint venture consisting of Ryan Seacrest, Anschutz Entertainment Group and Creative Artists Agency, a deal announced on January 18 (original co-owner/co-founder Mark Cuban retains a share).
|-
|After being interviewed in an online article by The Daily Beast, CNN anchorman and syndicated talk show host Anderson Cooper officially comes out as a homosexual man, thus confirming rumors about his sexuality that have surrounded his life.
|-
|The CW announces a partnership with Saban to take over the network's children's program block Toonzai, bringing programs such as Saban's Yu-Gi-Oh! and Power Rangers to the network and ending the current partnership with 4Kids Entertainment.
|-
|The Weather Channel announces plans to acquire Weather Underground, one of the internet's oldest weather services. While the site will no longer operate independently, Weather Underground will retain all existing staff and be run separately from TWC's online services.
|-
!6
|Dish Network subscribers within the Youngstown, Ohio market lose access to NBC affiliate WFMJ-TV, the result of a breakdown in re-negotiations between the satellite provider and owner Vindicator Printing Company to renew the station's carriage agreement.
|-
!7
|NBC and Telemundo replace their weekend morning Qubo children's program blocks with NBC Kids and MiTelemundo, both preschool-oriented lineups are programmed by PBS Kids Sprout (which NBC's parent company NBCUniversal jointly owns with Sesame Workshop, Apax Partners and PBS). Qubo will continue as a program block on Ion Television and as a 24-hour multicast channel on that network's stations (NBCUniversal will also continue to maintain an ownership stake in the channel).
|-
!9
|ABC launches Good Afternoon America, an afternoon extension of Good Morning America, hosted by Josh Elliott and Lara Spencer. The show is a temporary placeholder (airing for a nine-week limited run) for ABC's 2p.m. (Eastern Time) slot, an hour where ABC would relocate General Hospital after it cedes the 3p.m. (ET) slot (GH's longtime home) to its affiliates on September 10. GMA would get their afternoon extension back six years later on September 10, 2018, as GMA Day.
|-
! rowspan=3|10
|13 stations owned by Hearst Television are removed from Time Warner Cable, Bright House Networks and Insight Communications systems in Honolulu, Cincinnati, Plattsburgh, Boston, Manchester, Kansas City (two stations), Winston-Salem, Tampa, Orlando (two stations), Portland (Maine), Omaha, Louisville and Clarksburg (via Pittsburgh) after Hearst and TWC fail to reach a carriage agreement. Except for Honolulu (where only a message explaining the removal of the local Hearst-owned ABC affiliate is shown, which resulted in asking KHON and Hawaii News Now to simulcast their televised Honolulu Mayor's debate on July 11; its channel was later replaced with the Hallmark Movie Channel on July 13), the affected stations were replaced by out-of-market affiliates of their corresponding networks, including Nexstar-owned stations from Rochester, Wilkes-Barre and Terre Haute; the move prompted Nexstar to file legal action against TWC for using its stations as de facto affiliates in the affected markets without consent. Hearst's Milwaukee station, which was granted an exemption due to a technicality from a prior agreement with Charter Communications, was pulled from TWC on July 13. Both Time Warner and Hearst reached a deal that restored the stations back on the systems on July 19.
|-
|Shortly before midnight ET, 17 Viacom-owned networks (most notably MTV, Nickelodeon, Comedy Central and VH1) are removed from DirecTV after both companies fail to reach a new carriage agreement, with both sides accusing the other of being responsible. DirecTV replaced the channels with compatible outlets from other companies. In response to DirecTV advising subscribers to view original programming from the affected networks online, Viacom "temporarily slimmed down" access to current and other recent episodes of many programs from their websites on July 11, remaining in place until a deal is reached (as DirecTV does not offer internet service, the removal of Viacom-owned episodic streaming program content also affected internet users that do not subscribe to DirecTV, with access to this content mainly being restricted to subscription streaming websites such as Netflix and Hulu Plus). On July 18, renewed negotiations between the companies broke off after reportedly Viacom asked DirecTV to pay $500 million to carry premium channel Epix. The Viacom channels were restored on DirecTV after a new carriage agreement was made on July 20, with DirecTV gaining rights to carry live streams of Viacom-owned channels for its subscribers on laptops and mobile devices.
|-
|NBCUniversal confirms plans to sell its 15.8% stake in A+E Networks to co-owners The Walt Disney Company and Hearst Corporation, who will become 50-50 partners in the joint venture.
|-
!12–13
|Two members of American Idol'''s judging panel, Steven Tyler (on the 12th) and Jennifer Lopez (on the 13th), announce their departures from the show after two seasons."Jennifer Lopez leaving 'American Idol': 'The time has come'" from Zap2it (July 13, 2012)
|-
!13
|A Delaware bankruptcy court grants Tribune Company (owners of 23 television stations including WGN-TV/Chicago, KTLA/Los Angeles and WPIX/New York City, superstation WGN America, Antenna TV and 19 U.S. newspapers) approval of its reorganization plan for the company to emerge from Chapter 11 bankruptcy protection (Tribune filed for Chapter 11 in 2008 after accruing $13 billion in unsustainable debt from Sam Zell's $8 billion buyout of the company the year before). The company's senior debt holders, investment groups Oaktree Capital Management, JPMorgan Chase and Angelo, Gordon & Co., will assume control of Tribune Company. Tribune's junior creditor Aurelius Capital Management and indenture trustees Law Debenture Trust Company and Deutsche Bank Trust Company appealed the July 23 confirmation decision in the case, with Aurelius asking presiding U.S. Bankruptcy Judge Kevin Carey to stay the consummation of the restructuring plan. The junior creditors won a stay of the bankruptcy plan confirmation order on August 22 on the pretense the appealing parties pay a $1.5 billion bond by August 29.
|-
!15
|After 16 years since the inception of MSNBC, NBC News ends their partnership with Microsoft and rebrands their website as NBCNews.com. The decision was the result of issues regarding contract requirements that prevented Microsoft from using news content from other outlets on its co-owned websites, as well as NBC trying to distance its online news content from public perceptions of a slant towards a political ideology due to the MSNBC television channel's gradual programming shift to appeal to a liberal audience. NBC News plans to launch a new website for MSNBC by 2013.

After 4 years of airing on Spike, 1000 Ways To Die has its series finale. 
|-
!17
|Scripps Networks Interactive strikes a new multi-year carriage agreement with Comcast that will result in on-demand program content from Scripps-owned cable networks (such as HGTV and Food Network) being made available to Comcast Xfinity subscribers through its linear television and online services as well as through mobile devices.
|-
! rowspan=2|18
|Suddenlink Communications accepts a buyout offer from BC Partners Ltd., several investment firms (including Goldman Sachs, Quadrangle Group and Oaktree Capital Management) and company management, led by chairman and CEO Jerry Kent to purchase the cable operator for $6.6 billion ($2 billion in cash, along with the assumption of $4.6 billion in debt).BC Partners, Kent to Buy Suddenlink for $6.6 Billion, Multichannel News, July 19, 2012.
|-
|Montreal-based Cogeco purchases Quincy, Massachusetts-based cable operator Atlantic Broadband for $1.36 billion. The purchase will expand the presence of Cogeco (which already operates cable systems in several Eastern Canada provinces, primarily Ontario and Quebec) into the United States.
|-
! rowspan=3|19
|Newport Television announces the sale of 22 stations to three broadcasting firms: Nexstar Broadcasting Group will purchase 10 stations for $285 million (included are Little Rock duopoly KLRT/KASN, to be spun off to Mission Broadcasting (which is involved in several local marketing agreements with Nexstar in other markets) due to existing ownership of KARK and KARZ). Sinclair Broadcast Group will acquire six stations in San Antonio, Harrisburg, Cincinnati, Mobile and Wichita, along with local marketing agreements with stations in Harrisburg and Wichita. Cox Media Group will also purchase two duopolies: WAWS–WTEV/Jacksonville and KOKI–KMYT/Tulsa, all pending FCC approval (Cox later announced on July 20 that it will sell its television stations in El Paso, Johnstown, Steubenville and Reno [including an LMA with Reno's MyNetworkTV affiliate]). Newport will continue to seek buyers for stations in Bakersfield, Fresno, Rochester, Albany and Eugene that were not included in the pending deals.
|-
|Through an agreement separate from its purchase of six Newport Television-owned stations, Sinclair Broadcast Group will acquire the assets of shareholder-owned Bay Television, Inc., owners of MyNetworkTV affiliate WTTA/Tampa, for $40 million. Sinclair has operated WTTA under a local marketing agreement since 1998 (although not in conjunction with another station, as Sinclair does not own any other television stations in the Tampa Bay market).
|-
|Actor/comedian Fred Willard is removed from his narrator duties on the upcoming PBS series (and Antiques Roadshow spinoff) Market Warriors, following his July 18 arrest on lewd conduct charges after Los Angeles police officers allegedly caught Willard exposing his genitalia inside an adult movie theater in Hollywood. Antiques Roadshow host Mark L. Walberg will replace Willard as narrator of the program, including narrating episodes that were already completed with Willard.
|-
!23
||WWE Raw celebrated its 1000th episode from The Scottrade Center in St. Louis, Missouri and aired live on The USA Network.
|-
! rowspan="3"|24
|The Federal Communications Commission upholds a December 2011 ruling in a complaint case filed by The Tennis Channel, Inc. (owners of Tennis Channel) against Comcast, that alleged the cable provider discriminated against the channel by putting Comcast-owned sports channels (such as Golf Channel and NBC Sports Network) in digital basic programming tiers, while placing Tennis Channel on digital sports tiers that have fewer subscribers; the ruling required Comcast to move the Tennis Channel to the same tier as its co-owned networks. This is the first instance in which the FCC upheld a program carriage complaint by an independent company.
|-
|Actors Sofía Vergara, Jesse Tyler Ferguson, Eric Stonestreet, Julie Bowen and Ty Burrell (later joined by Ed O'Neill) file a lawsuit against 20th Century Fox Television arguing that their contracts for the ABC series Modern Family violate California state laws prohibiting personal service contracts from extending for longer than seven years (the lawsuit states the contracts required the actors to work on the series from February 2009 to June 2016) and include a cap on the percentage of annual salary increases that the actors receive for each additional season of the show. The lawsuit asks a judge to grant a ruling to void the contracts as the suit claims that clauses within them prohibit the actors from other work. The actors agreed to new contracts on July 27, effectively ending the lawsuit as part of the agreement.
|-
|Hearst Television extends its affiliation deal with MeTV for three years through 2015 and expands the digital network to five more outlets in Boston, Sacramento, Winston-Salem, Oklahoma City and Baltimore.
|-
!25
|News-Press & Gazette Company enters the Columbia–Jefferson City, Missouri market with the purchase of ABC affiliate KMIZ (including its MyNetworkTV and MeTV affiliated subchannels) and Fox affiliate KQFX-LD from JW Broadcasting for $16 million.
|-
! rowspan="3"|26
|Google announces the launch of a fiber optic television service set to make its initial roll out in Kansas City in September (alongside a high speed internet service also set to be offered by Google). Neighborhoods that initially receive the TV and internet services will be selected through feedback from Kansas City area residents and online registration. Google Fiber TV (which will also provide live streams of program content to iPad and Android devices) debuts with the absence of cable networks owned by Time Warner, The Walt Disney Company, AMC Networks and News Corporation from its channel lineup due to Google being unable to sign carriage agreements with those companies.
|-
|The Spokane Public Schools announced that it will vote to end its relationship with PBS member station KSPS, which the school holds the license for (one of five PBS outlets in the United States owned by public schools; six that are owned by municipalities overall) and has funded since its 1967 sign-on but since 1972 had been run by a non-profit group (Friends of KSPS), due to financial reasons.
|-
|CBS Sports Network signs an agreement with the United Football League giving the channel the television rights to broadcast Wednesday and Friday night games from the fledgling sports league during its eight-week regular season starting September 19 (CBS Sports Network replaces NBC Sports Network and AXS TV as national broadcasters of the UFL).
|-
! rowspan="5"|27
|The 2012 Summer Olympics commence in London and continue through August 12, broadcasting domestically within the U.S. on NBC and certain other NBCUniversal-owned cable channels (including NBC Sports Network, Bravo, USA Network, Telemundo, MSNBC, and CNBC). The opening ceremonies for the London Games draw a record 40.7 million viewers stateside, beating the 39.7 million mark set during the 1996 Summer Olympics in Atlanta.
|-
|Jim Walton announces his resignation as president of CNN effective at the end of the year, after being employed with the network for over 30 years.
|-
|Tribune Broadcasting renews its affiliation agreement with Fox for six of seven Tribune-owned stations affiliated with the network in Seattle, Hartford, Indianapolis, Sacramento, Grand Rapids and Harrisburg (KSWB/San Diego is exempt from the renewal agreement as that station has a separate affiliation agreement with Fox).
|-
|Shield Media, owned by White Knight Broadcasting vice president Sheldon Galloway, announces its purchase of Fox affiliate WXXA/Albany from Newport Television for $19.2 million. Shield plans on entering into a shared services agreement with ABC affiliate WTEN (owned by Young Broadcasting).
|-
|Mark Steines steps down from his position as co-anchor of Entertainment Tonight after 17 years to host the revival of Home & Family on Hallmark Channel.
|}

August

September

October

November

December

Programs

Debuts

The following is a list of shows that premiered in 2012.

Due to the economic slowdown, there were notably fewer television pilots in 2012 than in the years immediately prior to that, which reduced the number of roles available for actors.

The fall of 2012 also mirrored 1992 in the volume of new daytime talk shows. The new talk roster will include shows hosted by first-timers Katie Couric, Steve Harvey, Jeff Probst, and Bethenny Frankel (Frankel's show had a Summer trial run on six Fox Television Stations after an earlier effort to gain a wider fall clearance failed, and will launch nationwide next fall)."Bethenny Frankel Talk Show Premiering in June on Six Fox Affiliates," from The Hollywood Reporter, April 25, 2012 New talk shows will also feature Trisha Goddard (who hosted a talk show in her native United Kingdom) and Ricki Lake (whose new show will take a more mature tone compared to her 1993–2004 series).

The first ever television series to be produced in English and Spanish simultaneously, Justice for All with Judge Cristina Pérez, which is being produced by Entertainment Studios, began to air on both English and Spanish language broadcasting outlets starting in September.

Changes of network affiliation

The following shows will air new episodes on a different network than previous first-run episodes:

Returning this year

The following shows will return with new episodes after being canceled previously:

Milestone episodes and anniversaries

Ending this year

Movies and miniseries

Television stations

Launches

Closures

Stations changing network affiliation
The following is a list of television stations that have made or will make noteworthy network affiliation changes in 2012. In addition to the changes listed below, other stations were affected by the move of Universal Sports from an over-the-air to cable/satellite network, with affiliated stations either moving to other services (including some NBC O&O stations, which added the network's Nonstop''-branded information channel) or letting the channel go dark.

Births

Deaths

January

February

March

April

May

June

July

August

September

October

November

December

See also
 2012 in the United States
 List of American films of 2012

References

External links
 "NBC Announces 2011–2012 TV Schedule." from Aoltv.com (May 15, 2011.)
List of 2012 American television series at IMDb

 
2012